Andala Ramudu is a 1973 Telugu-language comedy drama film, film produced by N. S. Murthy under the Chitra Kalpana banner and directed by Bapu. It stars Akkineni Nageswara Rao, Latha   and music composed by K. V. Mahadevan. The film is based on Mullapudi Venkata Ramana's Janata Express (novel). The film is the debut to veteran artists Nutan Prasad and Latha. The film won two Nandi Awards. The film has given enthusiastically drawing atmosphere and spirit to the movie Godavari (2006), directed by Sekhar Kammula.

Plot
Seetarama Rao / Ramu (Akkineni Nageswara Rao) is an orphan brought up by an old lady Seetamma, who also stays alone and both of them live in a middle-class colony Panchavati. Everyone in the colony holds Ramu dear, in turn he too treats them as his family members. Once Ramu's briefcase is exchanged in the railway station with another containing a huge amount, belongs to a multi-millionaire J. B. Rao (Nagabhushanam). Actually, J. B. Rao is an innocent person, marionette in the hands of his secretary (Dhulipala), who loathes the poor folks. Ramu safely returns the briefcase to J. B. Rao when he is accused as a thief, but Seeta (Latha) the only daughter of J. B. Rao likes the ideologies of Ramu and falls for him. Meanwhile, Seetamma completes RamaKoti for the wealth of her son absconded in childhood and aspires to visit Bhadrachalam to submit it to the Lord. At the same time, Ramu is appointed as Deputy Collector at Bhadrachalam, but he wants to maintain secrecy regarding his job till the end of the destination. Meanwhile, the secretary ploys with J. B. Rao's nephew Giri (Nutan Prasad), spoils the mindset of J. B. Rao and conspires to couple up Seeta with Giri at the same Bhadrachalam. Ramu starts his pilgrimage along with his entire colony in a Janatha Boat, J. B. Rao and party also accompany them in a luxury boat. On the other side, a suspended Tahsaldar Ramalingam (Allu Ramalingaiah) a sly person, arrives with a Govt. boat for the Deputy Collector to pamper and get back his position. All the 3 are joined and the journey begins, which takes several twits and turns. In between an awful incident, Seetamma passes away when they try to stop the boats for the funeral, J. B. Rao insults her to throw into river Godavari as it is a waste of time. Here, furious Ramu wants to teach a lesson to J. B. Rao, so, he makes a play by hiding the boats and pretends as if they have been flooded away. Now, they make a halt in an island where Ramu arranges food for colony members. Eventually, J. B. Rao's group are starving and no one comes forward to sell or share their food when J. B. Rao realizes that money cannot do everything. So, he says sorry to Ramu and embraces all of them. At that point in time, surprising it is revealed that J. B. Rao is Seetamma's absconded son. Knowing it, he repents and collapses when the secretary seeks to kill him and Giri tries forcibly marry Seeta, when J. B. Rao understands nefariousness of his henchmen. At last, Ramu rescues Seeta, stops the baddies and affirms that Ramu is the new appointed Deputy Collector. Finally, the movie ends on a happy note with the marriage of Ramu and Seeta.

Cast

Akkineni Nageswara Rao as Seetarama Rao / Ramu
Latha as Seeta
Nagabhushanam as J. B. Rao
Allu Ramalingaiah as Teesesina Tahasildaru / Teeta / Ramalingaiah
Raja Babu as Appula Appa Rao
Dhulipala as Secretary 
Mukkamala (guest appearance)
Mada as Sarangu
Sakshi Ranga Rao as Subba Rao Mamagaru
Raavi Kondala Rao as Dasu
Nutan Prasad as Giri Babu
Kakarala as Bantrothu Bhadrayya
Venkateswara Rao 
K. K. Sarma as Priest
Potti Prasad as Butler 
Suryakantham as Samalamma
Radha Kumari
Manimala as Rani
Jhansi as Balanagamma
Master Visweswara Rao

Crew
Art: G. V. Subba Rao
Choreography: Pasumarthi, Taara-Sundaram, Raju-Seshu
Story - Dialogues: Mullapudi Venkata Ramana
Screenplay: Seetaramudu, Boodlumandi
Lyrics: Arudra, C. Narayana Reddy, Kosaraju Raghavaiah
Playback: M. Balamuralikrishna, V. Ramakrishna, J. V. Raghavulu, P. Susheela, Madhavapeddi Satyam, Raghuram, Vijayalakshmi 
Music: K. V. Mahadevan
Editing: Akkineni Sanjeeva Rao, Mandapati Ramachandrayya
Cinematography: V. S. R. Swamy
Producer: N. S. Murthy
Director: Bapu
Banner: Chitra Kalpana
Release Date: 12 September 1973

Music 

Music was composed by K. V. Mahadevan. Music released on Audio Company.

Box office
The film ran for more than 100 days.

Awards
Nandi Awards - 1973
Second Best Feature Film - Silver - N. S. Murthy
 Second Best Story Writer - Mullapudi Venkata Ramana

References

External links
 

Films directed by Bapu
1973 films
1970s Telugu-language films
Films scored by K. V. Mahadevan